All Aboard is the eighth album by R&B group Side Effect. Released in 1982, this was their third and final album for Elektra Records.

Track listing
I'm Likin' What You Do to Me 	4:17 	
Scatman 	4:23 	
Music Is My Way of Life 	3:46 	
Forever My Love 	4:21 	
You Can Do It 	3:41 	
Attitudes 	4:05 	
Take Me as I Am 	4:13 	
My Way 	5:18 	
I Want To... 	5:12

Personnel
Bobby Lyle, Michael Stanton - Keyboards
Michael Boddicker - Synthesizer
Ed Reddick, Nate Phillips, Robert Popwell - Bass
Gerry Davis, Ronnie Kaufmann - Drums
Vance Tenort - Percussion
Boppin' Brass - Horns

External links
 Side Effect-All Aboard at Discogs.
 [ All Aboard overview]. Allmusic.com.

References

1982 albums
Side Effect albums
Elektra Records albums
Albums recorded at Total Experience Recording Studios